Lenore Lonergan (June 2, 1928 in Toledo, Ohio – August 31, 1987) was a stage and film actress during the 1930s, 1940s and 1950s.

Biography 

She came from a long line of actors; her paternal grandfather, Lester Lonergan, was an Irish-born actor, and her father, Lester Lonergan, Jr., was a renowned actor. Her mother, Julia Mary (Juliet) McIntyre-Lonergan, daughter of Hector McIntyre and Julia Fennell of Sydney, Nova Scotia, Canada, was also an actress and opera singer who  trained at New England Conservatory of Music. There was a floor-to-ceiling portrait of her as Juliet Capulet from Romeo and Juliet that hung in their apartment at 58 West 58th Street in New York City. Her brother, Lester Lonergan III, was an actor as well.

She made her stage debut on Broadway at the age of 6, in Mother Lode, starring Melvyn Douglas. When she was 11, Lonergan was in the original cast of The Philadelphia Story on Broadway, playing the impish younger sister to Katharine Hepburn's character.
 
She later played juvenile roles in Junior Miss by Jerome Chodorov and Joseph Fields, and in Dear Ruth by Norman Krasna. She appeared in Crime Marches On, Fields Beyond, and in the film Tom, Dick and Harry, among others. Later films included Westward the Women, The Whistle at Eaton Falls, and The Lady Says No.

Personal life and death 
Lonergan was married to Richard Bertram, and she had a son, John Holtzman. She died of cancer on August 31, 1987 in Stuart, Florida.

Filmography

References

External links
 
 Richard Bertram Life and Times

1928 births
1987 deaths
American child actresses
American film actresses
American stage actresses
20th-century American actresses
Actresses from Toledo, Ohio
Deaths from cancer in Florida